Dheevaanaa is a 2001 Maldivian romantic thriller film directed by Aslam Rasheed. Produced under Slam Studio, the film stars Niuma Mohamed, Mohamed Shavin, Mohamed Afrah and Waleedha Waleed in pivotal roles. The film was an unofficial remake of Ram Gopal Varma's romantic thriller Pyaar Tune Kya Kiya (2001)

Premise
Zain (Mohamed Shavin), a company's photographer was roaming around the island searching for the perfect click for inclusion in their upcoming magazine where he meets Lamya Anwar (Niuma Mohamed) and clicks several photos of her without her permission. The pictures caught the attention of company's manager, Farooq (Mohamed Afrah) who included her portrait in their magazine's cover photo, much to Lamya's frustration. However, Zain and Lamya later bond; going for photoshoots together and working as his professional model. Lamya starts liking him but she gets heartbroken when Lamya discovers that Zain is actually married to a girl named Reena (Waleedha Waleed).

Cast 
 Niuma Mohamed as Lamya Anwar
 Mohamed Shavin as Zain
 Mohamed Afrah as Farooq
 Waleedha Waleed as Reesha
 Ali Shameel as Anwar
 Habeeb as Lhabey
 Ravee Farooq (Special appearance in the song "Hiyy Masthu Ishq")

Soundtrack

References

2001 films
Remakes of Maldivian films
2000s romantic thriller films
Maldivian romantic thriller films